Leslie Ryan is an American non-fiction writer from Richmond, Virginia, and winner of the 2000 Rona Jaffe Foundation Writers' Award.

References

Living people
Rona Jaffe Foundation Writers' Award winners
Year of birth missing (living people)
Writers from Richmond, Virginia
American non-fiction writers
21st-century American women writers
American women non-fiction writers